Maik Baumgarten (born 26 April 1993) is a German footballer who plays for NOFV-Oberliga Süd club FC An der Fahner Höhe.

Club career
He made his senior debut for Rot-Weiß Erfurt in December 2010, as a substitute for Denis-Danso Weidlich in a 4–0 win over VfR Aalen.

He scored his first goal for Hansa Rostock on 19 December 2015, with a stunning 25 yard curving dipping strike, against Chemnitzer FC.

External links

1993 births
People from Eisenach
Footballers from Thuringia
Living people
German footballers
Association football midfielders
FC Rot-Weiß Erfurt players
FC Hansa Rostock players
KSV Hessen Kassel players
3. Liga players
Regionalliga players
Oberliga (football) players
Hessenliga players